Genestealer is an expansion set published by Games Workshop in 1990 for the science fiction board game Space Hulk.

Description
Genestealer introduces psychic combat to Space Hulk., as well as Genestealer Hybrids armed with various ranged weaponry.

Reception
In the April 1991 edition of Dragon (Issue #168), Ken Rolston thought the "charming 'space magic,' card-driven, psychic-powers system [...] adds lots of flavor while completely altering the balance of game elements — a good thing if you’ve played the Space Hulk game to death and worked out all the basic tactics."

Awards
In 1991, Genestealer won the Origins Award for Best Fantasy or Science Fiction Boardgame of 1990.

References

Board games introduced in 1990
Origins Award winners